The Bambi Molesters were a surf rock band from Sisak, Croatia, founded in 1995.
They performed regularly in Croatia and all over Europe, often opening for the US rock band R.E.M.  They released five studio albums from 1997 until 2013. In  collaboration with Chris Eckman, leader of the gothic-americana band The Walkabouts, the project "The Strange" was born. In 2018, after 13 years, they announced on Facebook that they would disband 'It's time for a new era' but did not reveal any reasons.

Band members
 Lada Furlan Zaborac - bass guitar
 Hrvoje Zaborac - drums
 Dalibor Pavičić - guitar
 Dinko Tomljanović - guitar

Discography

Singles and EPs
 Play Out of Tune (Cassette), 1995
 Coastal Disturbance (7" EP), 1996
 Bikini Machines (7"), 1998

Studio albums
 Dumb Loud Hollow Twang (Dirty Old Town/Kamikaze Records, 1997/1998)
 Intensity! (Dancing Bear/Kamikaze Records, 1999)
 Sonic Bullets: 13 From The Hip (Dancing Bear, 2001)
 Dumb Loud Hollow Twang Deluxe (Dancing Bear, 2003)
 As The Dark Wave Swells (Dancing Bear, 2010)

Appearances on compilations
 Smells Like Surf Spirit, 1997
 Rolling Stone - Rare Trax, Vol. 5 Summer In The City, 1998
 Feathers, Wood & Aluminium, 1998
 Tuberider, 1999
 Monster Party 2000, 2000
 For A Few Guitars More, 2002
 Guitar Ace: Link Wray Tribute, 2003
 Bang Bang Soundtrack, 2006
 Projekt R.E.M.: Pure Energy Music , 2012

In popular culture
The track "Malaguena" (from their third album Sonic Bullets: 13 from the Hip) was featured in the soundtrack of the 2018 Spanish period comedy-drama Arde Madrid, session 1	"Poco católica".

The track "Chaotica" (from their third album Sonic Bullets: 13 from the Hip) was featured in the soundtrack of Season 5 of the TV series Breaking Bad.

References

External links
 Official site
 As the Dark Wave Swells, album review at The Sunday Times
 As the Dark Wave Swells, album review at The New Zealand Herald

Surf music groups
Croatian rock music groups
Musical groups established in 1995
Musical groups disestablished in 2018
1995 establishments in Croatia
2018 disestablishments in Croatia
Glitterhouse Records artists